The Free Fatherland Party (PPL) was a left-wing political party in Brazil. Founded on April 21, 2009 by members of the Revolutionary Movement 8th October (MR-8), it advocates for scientific socialism. Its symbols were a green and yellow flag with a five-pointed red star and the inscription "Pátria Livre". PPL's identification number, as determined by the Supreme Electoral Court, was 54.

History

PPL was founded mainly by members of the Revolutionary Movement 8th October (MR-8), who were joined by union leaders (linked to the Central Geral dos Trabalhadores do Brasil national trade union center), student movement activists and feminists. MR-8 was founded in 1964 from a split in the Brazilian Communist Party (PCB), under the name Dissidence of Rio de Janeiro (DI-RJ). A Marxist–Leninist guerrilla group, it promoted armed actions against the military dictatorship and advocated the establishment of a Communist regime in the country. Later, DI-RJ became MR-8 in order to pay a tribute to Che Guevara, which was captured by the CIA in Bolivia on October 8, 1967. Under the new name, the group performed its most notable action: the kidnapping of U.S. Ambassador Charles Burke Elbrick, turned into the 1997 film Four Days in September by Bruno Barreto.

Since the beginning of the democratization process, MR-8 was active inside the Brazilian Democratic Movement Party (PMDB), being an arm of quercismo in the social movements. In 2008, after considering a merger with the Workers' Party (PT), members of MR-8 decided to create a new political party. The founding act of PPL happened on April 21, 2009 and was attended by hundreds of members of PMDB, as well as several representatives of left-leaning parties, such as PT, PCdoB, PSB, PDT, PCB and the Communist Party of Bolivia. On October 3, 2011, judges of the Supreme Electoral Court unanimously granted the request for PPL's creation, making it the 29th legal political party in Brazil.

In 2014 general election PPL endorsed Marina Silva, who arrived 3rd with 21,32% of the votes. In 2018 general election PPL endorsed João Vicente Goulart (son of former president João Goulart), who got 0,03% of votes, arriving 13th.

In 2018, after falling to get enough votes to keep receiving funds from the Superior Electoral Court, the party announced that it would merge with the Communist Party of Brazil (PCdoB) and in December of that year the party signed a compromise making the merge official and the organization ceased to exist.

Ideology

The political aim of the PPL was to radicalise the course followed by the Luiz Inácio Lula da Silva administration. To this end, it listed  five basic objectives: the strengthening of the internal market, in order to generate more jobs; the reduction of the basic interest rate; the technological development of the country; the accomplishment of full economy; and the ensuring of good public health and education for all.

Electoral results

Presidential elections

References

2009 establishments in Brazil
2018 disestablishments in Brazil
Communist parties in Brazil
Defunct political parties in Brazil
Far-left politics in Brazil
Political parties disestablished in 2018
Political parties established in 2009
Left-wing politics in Brazil
Left-wing parties
Far-left political parties